West Virginia Route 61 is a north–south state highway in central and southern West Virginia. The southern terminus of the route is at West Virginia Route 41 in Piney View. The northern terminus is at U.S. Route 60 (Patrick Street Bridge) in Charleston.

Major intersections

References
 

061
Transportation in Fayette County, West Virginia
Transportation in Kanawha County, West Virginia
Transportation in Raleigh County, West Virginia